The Upturned Glass is a 1947 British film noir psychological thriller directed by Lawrence Huntington and starring James Mason, Rosamund John and Pamela Kellino. The screenplay concerns a leading brain surgeon who murders a woman he believes to be responsible for the death of the woman he loved.

It was made at Gainsborough Pictures' Islington Studios, with sets designed by the art director Andrew Mazzei. It was made as an independent production overseen by Sydney Box, then head of Gainsborough.

Plot
Michael Joyce, a Harley Street brain specialist, unhappily married and separated from his wife, falls in love with Emma Wright when she brings her young daughter Ann for consultation. Unfortunately, neither is free to marry, so the affair ends almost as soon as it begins. Later, however, Emma dies after a fall from her country manor's second-story bedroom window. Upon hearing of the tragedy, Michael attends the coroner's inquest, where Ann and Emma's sister-in-law, Kate Howard, both testify. Emma's death is ruled accidental, but Michael suspects foul play. To gain information, he romances Kate, who is unaware that Michael was Emma's lover though she knew Emma was seeing someone. Eventually, Michael learns that Kate intended to blackmail Emma for financial gain. He considers the situation a misjustice and resolves to take matters into his own hands.

One afternoon, Michael drives Kate to Emma's country house, where Michael maneuvers her into the same upper-story bedroom from which Emma fell. He then carries out his revenge, pushing Kate out the same window. Retrieving her corpse from the courtyard below and placing it in the car's back, he drives toward the cliffs just over the sea, where he intends to dispose of Kate's body. On the way, however, he encounters a stranded doctor, a general practitioner, who begs a ride to the home of a patient, a young woman whose survival of a head injury is doubtful. But when the doctor asks Michael for a second opinion, the latter examines the woman and decides she might have a chance. And to the immense relief of the patient's family, Michael succeeds in saving her life.

Resuming his trek toward the sea with Kate's body, Michael undergoes the realization that he is not "perfectly sane" and that perhaps his status as a "valuable member of society" is indeed questionable. He stands at the edge of the cliff and looks down toward the sea—and then, just as in the case of both Emma and Kate, he falls downward to his own death.

Cast

 James Mason as Michael Joyce  
 Rosamund John as Emma Wright  
 Pamela Kellino as Kate Howard  
 Ann Stephens as Ann Wright  
 Morland Graham as Clay  
 Brefni O'Rorke as Dr. Farrell  
 Henry Oscar as Coroner  
 Jane Hylton as Miss Marsh  
 Sheila Huntington as 1st Girl Student  
 Susan Shaw as 2nd Girl Student
 Peter Cotes as Male Student  
 Nuna Davey as Mrs. Deva  
 Judith Carol as Joan Scott-Trotter  
 Jno. P. Monaghan as U.S. Driver  
 Maurice Denham as Mobile Policeman
 Janet Burnell as Sylvia 
 Margaret Withers as Party Guest 
 Beatrice Varley as Injured Girl's Mother 
 Hélène Burls as Farm Laborer's Wife 
 Howard Douglas as Lorry Driver 
 Richard Afton as Lorry Driver's Mate 
 Lyn Evans as County Policeman

Production
In the mid 1940s James Mason was the biggest star in British films, coming off successes like They Were Sisters, The Seventh Veil and The Wicked Lady.

Mason and his then wife, Pamela Kellino (Mason), had originally planned to develop a film on the Brontë family entitled The Upturned Glass, written by Pamela and starring James as Branwell Brontë. They dropped the idea after learning of the Hollywood production Devotion, and instead developed a psychological thriller under the same title, in which both Masons would play leading roles.

The film was based on a story by American serviceman Jno. P. Monaghan, whom the Masons had befriended when touring the US for the American Red Cross. Kellino and Monaghan worked on the story together, and Monaghan appeared in a small role as an American military truck driver. In the original draft of the script, Mason was to play a detective and the film was to focus around a school mistress. However after Mason was unable to secure the services of the actors they wanted, Celia Johnson and Phyllis Calvert, the script was rewritten. The new script had nothing to do with an upturned glass but they decided to keep the title because it had received considerable publicity.

James Mason co-produced the film with Sydney Box, with whom he had previously worked on the Academy-Award-winning The Seventh Veil. For his work on The Upturned Glass, Mason, who at the time had "enormous drawing power", received the equivalent of $240,000 in U.S. dollars, plus a percentage of the profits.

The project was announced in February 1946 with the co stars originally to be Kellino, Rosamund John and Robert Newton. It was to follow production of Odd Man Out. Mason was doing the film under his contract with Rank, having turned down Hungry Hill.

Filming began at Riverside Studio in June 1946.

Mason made it just before leaving for the US.

In March 1947 J Arthur Rank sent editor Allan Obiston to the USA for Mason's thoughts on the cut.

Reception

Box office
According to trade papers, the film was a "notable box office attraction" at British cinemas in 1947.

It earned a reported profit of £45,800.

References

External links

Review of film at Variety

1947 films
1947 drama films
British drama films
British films about revenge
Films set in hospitals
Films set in London
Films directed by Lawrence Huntington
Islington Studios films
Films shot at Riverside Studios
British black-and-white films
1940s English-language films
1940s British films